Ellis Reginald Davies (27 May 1929 – 9 February 2009) was a Welsh professional footballer who played for Southend United, Newcastle United, Swansea Town and Carlisle United, and won six caps for Wales.

Davies began his professional career at Southend United in 1949 after serving in the British Army, having previously been on the books of Southampton as an amateur. After two impressive seasons at Roots Hall, he was signed by Newcastle United for £10,000 in April 1951, where Newcastle paid £9,000 up front and £1,000 when Davies made his full international debut, which he did against Scotland at Ninian Park, 18 months after joining Newcastle. Davies went on to play six times for Wales, his final cap coming against England in 1957.

After seven seasons at Newcastle, where he played 157 league matches and scored 49 goals, Davies was sent to Swansea Town in October 1958 as part of the deal that took Ivor Allchurch to Newcastle. Davies spent four seasons at Swansea, before finishing his league career with two seasons at Carlisle United. In 1966, Davies left professional football, and joined non-league Merthyr Tydfil where he spent one season.

As of November 1970 he was player-manager of King's Lynn.

In 1971, Davies emigrated to Perth, Australia, where he stayed in football and coached several local sides. He remained in Perth until his death on 9 February 2009.

References

1929 births
2009 deaths
Carlisle United F.C. players
King's Lynn F.C. players
Merthyr Tydfil F.C. players
Newcastle United F.C. players
Southend United F.C. players
Swansea City A.F.C. players
Welsh footballers
Wales international footballers
Welsh emigrants to Australia
Southampton F.C. players
Association football forwards
20th-century British Army personnel
Welsh military personnel